The Donut King is a 2020 American documentary film which tells the life story of California donut shop owner Ted Ngoy.

Development
The Donut King was directed by Alice Gu, and is her first feature film. Having grown up in Los Angeles, she was doubtful when her children's nanny made a reference to "Cambodian" donuts; she thought all donuts were simply "American." Upon looking into the matter, she learned about Ted Ngoy and became fascinated with the topic. She reached out to Ngoy and other Cambodian families who ran donut shops, and within six weeks began principal photography.

Production
Ngoy was hesitant to return to California for the film; he was estranged from his children and former friends. Gu persuaded him to and, ultimately, he regarded his return as a 'healing experience,' and his ex-wife and children have forgiven him.

Release
The Donut King had its world premiere in the Documentary Feature Competition the South by Southwest film festival.

Reception

Critical response
The film received 69/100 on Metacritic, receiving "generally favorable reviews." In a positive review, Richard Whittaker with The Austin Chronicle said that "Gu does stellar work compiling and constructing Ngoy’s life story through interviews and archive and contemporary footage," and added "the animation sequences by Chapeau Studios and 1881 Animation that make the perfect drizzle of icing." Giving it three-out-of-four stars, Nick Allen of RogerEbert.com called the The Donut King "a heartwarming albeit scattered documentary from director Alice Gu," and praised the film for "its balance of poppy visuals and detailed history." In a mixed review, Brad Wheeler of The Globe and Mail said the film is "well worth watching" while saying there "are holes in this doughnut story."

Impact
Whittaker said that "as Asian Americans face increasing racism, its closing message about how immigrant communities...define America has only become more timely."

References

External links
 
 The Donut King at PBS.org

2020 films
2020 documentary films
American documentary films
Documentary films about businesspeople
Films about Cambodian Americans
2020s English-language films
2020s American films